Champagne is a former commune in the Eure-et-Loir department in northern France. Since January 2015, it is part of the commune Goussainville.

Population

See also
Communes of the Eure-et-Loir department

References

Former communes of Eure-et-Loir